Shabana Azmi (born 18 September 1950) is an Indian actress of film, television and theatre. Her career in the Hindi film industry has spanned over 160 films, mostly within independent and neorealist parallel cinema, though her work extended to mainstream films as well as a number of foreign projects. One of India's most acclaimed actresses, Azmi is known for her portrayals of distinctive, often unconventional female characters across several genres. She has won a record five National Film Awards for Best Actress, in addition to five Filmfare Awards and several international accolades. The Government of India honoured her with the Padma Shri in 1998 and the Padma Bhushan in 2012.

The daughter of poet Kaifi Azmi and stage actress Shaukat Azmi, she is an alumna of Film and Television Institute of India of Pune. Azmi made her film debut in 1974 with Ankur and soon became one of the leading actresses of parallel cinema, then a new-wave movement of art films known for their serious content and realism and sometimes received government patronage. Several of her films have been cited as a form of progressivism and social reformism which offer a realistic portrayal of Indian society, its customs and traditions.

In addition to acting, Azmi is a social and women's rights activist. She is married to poet and screenwriter Javed Akhtar. She is a Goodwill Ambassador of the United Nations Population Fund (UNPFA). In appreciation of Azmi's life and works, the President of India gave her a nominated (unelected) membership of the Rajya Sabha, the upper house of parliament.

Early life and background 
Azmi was born into a Shia family, in Hyderabad, India. Her parents are Kaifi Azmi (an Indian poet) and Shaukat Azmi (a veteran Indian People's Theatre Association stage actress), both of whom were members of the Communist Party of India. Her brother, Baba Azmi, is a cinematographer, and her sister-in-law, Tanvi Azmi, is also an actress. Azmi was named at the age of eleven by Ali Sardar Jafri. Her parents used to call her Munni. Baba Azmi was named by Prof. Masood Siddiqui as Ahmer Azmi. Her parents had an active social life, and their home was always thriving with people and activities of the communist party. It was not unusual for her to wake up in the morning and find members of the communist party sleeping about, from a previous night's communist social that ran late. Early in childhood, the environment in her home inculcated into her a respect for family ties, social and human values; and her parents always supported her to develop a passion for intellectual stimulation and growth.

Azmi attended Queen Mary School, Mumbai. She completed a graduate degree in Psychology from St. Xavier's College, Mumbai, and followed it with a course in acting at the Film and Television Institute of India (FTII), Pune. She explained the reason she decided to attend the film institute, saying: "I had the privilege of watching Jaya Bhaduri in a (Diploma) film, Suman, and I was completely enchanted by her performance because it was unlike the other performances I had seen. I really marvelled at that and said, 'My god, if by going to the Film Institute I can achieve that, that's what I want to do.'" Azmi eventually topped the list of successful candidates of 1972.

Career 
 
Azmi graduated from the FTII in 1973 and signed on to Khwaja Ahmad Abbas' Faasla and began work on Kanti Lal Rathod's Parinay as well. Her first release, however, was Shyam Benegal's directorial debut Ankur (1974). Belonging to the art-house genre of neo-realistic films, Ankur is based on a true story which occurred in Hyderabad. Azmi played Lakshmi, a married servant and villager who drifts into an affair with a college student who visits the countryside. Azmi was not the original choice for the film, and several leading actresses of that time refused to do it. The film went on to become a major critical success, and Azmi won the National Film Award for Best Actress for her performance. Qurratulain Hyder wrote that Azmi lives her role and acts like a seasoned dramatic actress in her first film.

She went on to receive the National Film Award for Best Actress consecutively for three years from 1983 to 1985 for her roles in Arth, Khandhar and Paar. Godmother (1999) earned her a record-setting fifth National Film Award, taking her tally to five. Azmi's acting has been characterised by a real-life depiction of the roles played by her. In Mandi, she acted as a madam of a whorehouse. For this role, she put on weight and even chewed betel. Real life portrayals continued in almost all her movies. These included the role of a woman named Jamini resigned to her destiny in Khandhar and a typical urban Indian wife, homemaker and mother in Masoom.

She mainly acted in experimental and parallel Indian cinema. Deepa Mehta's 1996 film Fire depicts her as a lonely woman, Radha, in love with her sister-in-law. The on-screen depiction of lesbianism (perhaps the first in Indian cinema) drew severe protests and threats from many social groups as well as by the Indian authorities. Her role as Radha brought her international recognition with the Silver Hugo Award for Best Actress at the 32nd Chicago Film Festival and Jury Award for Best Actress at Outfest, Los Angeles. She was the initial choice for Deepa Mehta's Water, which was planned to hit the floors in 2000. A few scenes were already shot. Azmi had to shave her head with Nandita Das to portray the character of Shakuntala. However, due to political reasons, the film was shelved and later shot in 2005 with Seema Biswas replacing Azmi.

Some of her notable films are Shyam Benegal's Nishant (1975), Junoon (1978), Susman (1978), and Antarnaad (1992); Satyajit Ray's Shatranj Ke Khilari (The Chess Players); Mrinal Sen's Khandhar, Genesis, Ek Din Achanak; Saeed Mirza's Albert Pinto Ko Gussa Kyon Aata Hai; Sai Paranjpye's Sparsh and Disha; Gautam Ghose's Paar; Aparna Sen's Picnic and Sati; Mahesh Bhatt's Arth; and Vinay Shukla's Godmother. Her other films include the commercially successful Manmohan Desai's Amar Akbar Anthony and Parvarish and Prakash Mehra's Jwalamukhi. Azmi starred in Hollywood productions such as John Schlesinger's Madame Sousatzka (1988) and Roland Joffe's City of Joy (1992).

Azmi debuted on the small screen in a soap opera titled Anupama. She portrayed a modern Indian woman who, while endorsing traditional Indian ethos and values, negotiated more freedom for herself. She has participated in many stage plays: notable among them include M. S. Sathyu's Safed Kundali (1980), based on The Caucasian Chalk Circle; and Feroz Abbas Khan's Tumhari Amrita with actor Farooq Sheikh, which ran for five years. She toured Singapore on an assignment with the Singapore Repertory Theatre Company, acting in Ingmar Bergman's adaptation of Ibsen's A Doll's House, which was directed by Rey Buono. She toured the UK, Dubai and India with British production Happy Birthday Sunita by Theatre Company RIFCO Arts in 2014. Pointing out the differences in all these media, she once remarked that theatre was really the actor's medium; the stage was the actor's space; cinema was the director's medium; and television was a writer's medium.

Personal life 

Azmi was engaged to Benjamin Gilani in late 1970s, but the engagement was called off. Later, she married Javed Akhtar, a lyricist, poet and scriptwriter in Hindi films, on 9 December 1984, making her a member of the Akhtar-Azmi film family. It was Javed Akhtar's second marriage, the first being with another Hindi film scriptwriter, Honey Irani. However Azmi's parents objected to her being involved with a married man with 2 children (Farhan Akhtar and Zoya Akhtar). Indian actresses Farah Naaz and Tabu are her nieces and Tanvi Azmi is her sister-in-law.

Azmi has been a committed social activist, active in supporting child survival and fighting AIDS and injustice in real life.

She has participated in several plays and demonstrations denouncing communalism. In 1989, along with Swami Agnivesh and Asghar Ali Engineer, she undertook a four-day march for communal harmony from New Delhi to Meerut. Among the social groups whose causes she has advocated are slum dwellers, displaced Kashmiri Pandit migrants and victims of the earthquake at Latur (Maharashtra, India). The 1993 Mumbai riots appalled her and she emerged as a forceful critic of religious extremism. In 1995, she reflected on her life as an activist in an interview in Rungh. After the 11 September 2001 attacks, she opposed the advice of the grand mufti of Jama Masjid calling upon the Muslims of India to join the people of Afghanistan in their fight by retorting that the leader go there alone.

She has campaigned against ostracism of victims of AIDS. A small film clip issued by the Government of India depicts an HIV positive child cuddled in her arms and saying: "She does not need your rejection, she needs your love". In a Bengali film named Meghla Akash, directed by Nargis Akter, she played the role of a physician treating AIDS patients.

She has also given her voice to an HIV/AIDS education animated software tutorial created by the nonprofit organisation TeachAids.

Since 1989, she has been a member of the National Integration Council headed by the Prime Minister of India; a member of National AIDS Commission (of India); and was nominated (in 1997) as a member of the Rajya Sabha, the upper house of the Indian parliament. In 1998, the United Nations Population Fund appointed her as its Goodwill Ambassador for India.

In 2019 Indian general election, she actively campaigned for Kanhaiya Kumar who contested from Begusarai, Bihar on a Communist Party of India (CPI) ticket.

Filmography 

She has acted in more than one hundred Hindi films, both in the mainstream as well as in Parallel Cinema. Several of her films have received attention in the international arena and Scandinavian countries, including at the Norwegian Film Institute, the Smithsonian Institution and the American Film Institute. She has appeared in a number of foreign films, most of which have won international acclaim, including John Schlesinger's Madame Sousatzka, Nicholas Klotz's Bengali Night, Roland Joffe's City of Joy, Channel 4's Immaculate Conception, Blake Edwards' Son of the Pink Panther, and Ismail Merchant's In Custody.

Accolades

Major associations and honours 
Civilian award
 1988: Awarded the Padma Shri by the Government of India.
 2012: Awarded the Padma Bhushan by the Government of India.
National Film Awards
Azmi has received the National Film Award for Best Actress five times, making her the overall most-awarded actor in the function:

Filmfare Awards

International awards

Miscellaneous awards and honours 

 1999: Mumbai Academy of the Moving Image, Significant Contribution to Indian Cinema.
 2002: Martin Luther King Professorship award by the University of Michigan conferred on her in recognition of her contribution to arts, culture and society.
 2006: Gandhi International Peace Award, awarded by Gandhi Foundation, London.
 2007:  ANR National Award by the Akkineni International Foundation
 2009: She was honoured with the World Economic Forum's Crystal Award
 2012: She was honoured by Walk of the Stars as her hand print was preserved for posterity at Bandra Bandstand in Mumbai.
 2013: Awarded the Honorary Fellowship by the National Indian Students Union UK
 2018: Power Brands awarded Shabana Azmi the Bharatiya Manavata Vikas Puraskar for being one of the greatest and most versatile thespians of Indian cinema, for being a champion of women's education and a consistent advocate for civil and human rights, equality and peace and for empowering lives every day through the Mijwan Welfare Society.
National awards
 1988: Yash Bhartiya Award by the Government of Uttar Pradesh for highlighting women's issues in her work as an actress and activist.
 1994: Rajiv Gandhi Award for "Excellence of Secularism"
Honorary doctorates
 2003: She was conferred with an honorary doctorate by the Jadavpur University in West Bengal in 2003.
 2007: She was conferred with an honorary doctorate in art by Chancellor of the University Brandan Foster by the Leeds Metropolitan University in Yorkshire
 2008: She was conferred with an honorary doctorate by the Jamia Milia Islamia on Delhi in 2008.
 2013: She was conferred with an honorary doctorate by Simon Fraser University.
 2014: She was conferred with an honorary doctorate by TERI University on 5 February 2014.

References

Notes 
 India's 50 Most Illustrious Women by Indra Gupta
 Holt, Julia; Phalke, Shubhra; Basic Skills Agency. Shabana Azmi. London : Basic Skills Agency, 1995. .

External links 

 
 Shabana Azmi NGO in India
  – interview on Al Jazeera English (video, 25 mins)
 Time: Shabana Azmi
 Indian American Arts Council
 Article from the Village Voice 
 EveryOne campaign brand ambassador: Shabana Azmi

1950 births
Living people
20th-century Indian actresses
Indian film actresses
Recipients of the Padma Shri in arts
St. Xavier's College, Mumbai alumni
University of Mumbai alumni
Film and Television Institute of India alumni
Indian women activists
People from Delhi
Actresses in Hindi cinema
People from Azamgarh
Indian stage actresses
Recipients of the Padma Bhushan in arts
Best Actress National Film Award winners
Nominated members of the Rajya Sabha
Gandhi International Peace Award recipients
Filmfare Awards winners
Filmfare Lifetime Achievement Award winners
Screen Awards winners
International Indian Film Academy Awards winners
Zee Cine Awards winners
Women members of the Rajya Sabha
Actresses from Hyderabad, India